Demographics of Libya is the demography of Libya, specifically covering population density, ethnicity, education level, health of the populace, economic status, and religious affiliations, as well as other aspects of the Libyan population. The Libyan population resides in the country of Libya, a territory located on the Mediterranean coast of North Africa, to the west of and adjacent to Egypt.  Libyans live in Tripoli. It is the capital of the country and first in terms of urban population, as well as Benghazi, Libya's second largest city.

History 

Historically Berber, over the centuries, Libya has been occupied by the Phoenicians, Greeks, Romans, Arabs, and Italians. The Phoenicians had a big impact on Libya. Many of the coastal towns and cities of Libya were founded by the Phoenicians as trade outposts within the southern Mediterranean coast in order to facilitate the Phoenician business activities in the area. Starting in the 8th century BCE, Libya was under the rule of the Phoenician Carthage. After the Romans defeated Carthage in the Third Punic War, Libya became a Roman province under the name of Tripolitania until the 7th century CE when Libya was conquered by the Arab Muslims as part of the Arab conquest of North Africa, and Arab migrations to the region began since then. In the 11th century, major migrations of Banu Hilal and Banu Sulaym from the Arabian Peninsula to Libya began, with other nomadic tribes from Eastern Arabia. Centuries after that, the Ottoman Empire conquered Libya in 1551. It remained in control of its territory until 1911 when the country was conquered by Italy. In the 18th century Libya was used as the base for various pirates.the story of the Awlad Sulayman, an Arab group from present-day Libia who dominated northern Lake Chad in the 19th century,. Since the Middle Ages, the populations of this region have shared close political, economic and social ties maintained by the mobility specific to the nomadic way of life. These relationships, fluid due to the difficulties of surviving in this difficult environment, have always been structured in turn, through conflict and cooperation, both of which produced rapidly changing alliances. In the middle of the 18th century, the Awlad Sulayman carved out a vast area of influence for themselves in Sirte and Fezzan by force of arms and by their alliances with neighboring peoples and the Libian administration. Defeated by the Ottoman administration in Tripoli at the end of the 1830s, the survivors of the Awlad Sulayman took refuge in the Lake Chad basin where they reconstituted the conditions for their success in Libya; they controlled trans-Saharan trade and maintained their links with Libian society. Despite the limits imposed on their action by the French colonization of Chad and the Italian colonization of Libia; the Awlad Sulayman retained regional influence during colonial times and appear to maintain it today.
In the Second World War Libya was one of the main battlegrounds of North Africa. During the war, the territory was under an Anglo-French military government until it was overrun by the Axis Powers, who, in turn, were defeated by the Allies in 1943.

In 1951, the country was granted independence by the United Nations, being governed by King Idris. In 1969, a military coup led by Muammar Gaddafi resulted in the overthrow of King Idris I. Gaddafi then established an anti-Western leadership. In 1970, Gaddafi ordered all British and American military bases closed.

The Libyan population has increased rapidly after 1969. They were only 2 million in 1968, and 5 million in 2006. . Many migrant workers came to Libya since 1969. Among the workers were construction workers and laborers from Tunisia, teachers and laborers from Egypt, teachers from Palestine, and doctors and nurses from Yugoslavia and Bulgaria. 1,000,000 workers, mainly from other neighboring African countries like Sudan, Niger, Chad and Mali, migrated to Libya in the 1990s, after changes were made to Libya's Pan-African policies.

Gaddafi used money from the sale of oil to improve the living conditions of the population and to assist Palestinian guerrillas in their fight against the Israelis. In 1979, Libya fought in Uganda to assist the government of Idi Amin in the Ugandan Civil War, and in 1981, fought in the Libyan-Chadian War. Libya had occupied the Aozou Strip; however, in 1990 the International Court of Justice submitted the case and allowed the full recuperation of territory to Chad.

In September 2008, Italy and Libya signed a memorandum by which Italy would pay $5 billion over the next 20 years to compensate Libya for its dominion over Libya for its reign of 30 years.

Since 2011, the country is swept by Libyan Civil War, which broke out between the Anti-Gaddafi rebels and the Pro-Gaddafi government in 2011, culminating in the death and overthrow of Gaddafi. Nevertheless, even today Libya still continues to generate problems within the area and beyond, greatly affecting its population and the migrant route to Europe.

Under Gaddhafi the country had oil income and a level of stability, allowing birthrates to fall to 2.56 by 2010.  However with instability, the government in Libya announced population of 7.7 million as of Oct 2022, indicating a substantial population boom and/or migration.  Since migration is less likely, birthrates probably soared as women no longer afforded security of the old regime, about 10-15% higher than expected.

Population

Libya has a small population residing in a large land area. Population density is about 50 persons per km2 (130/sq. mi.) in the two northern regions of Tripolitania and Cyrenaica, but falls to less than one person per km2 (2.7/sq. mi.) elsewhere. Ninety percent of the people live in less than 10% of the area, primarily along the coast. About 90% of the population is urban, mostly concentrated in the four largest cities, Tripoli, Benghazi, Misrata and Bayda. As of 2019, twenty-eight percent of the population is estimated to be under the age of 15, but this proportion has decreased considerably during the past decades. The majority of the population of Libya is composed of Arabs.

Age distribution
Data taken from United Nations Demographic Yearbook 2020 

Population Estimates by Sex and Age Group (1.VII.2015):

Population history

Population census
Eight population censuses have been carried out in Libya, the first in 1931 and the most recent one in 2006. The population multiplied sixfold between 1931 and 2006.

Vital statistics
During the past 60 years the demographic situation of Libya changed considerably. Since the 1950s, life expectancy increased steadily and the infant mortality rates decreased. As the fertility rates remained high until the 1980s (the number of births tripled between 1950–55 and 1980–85), population growth was very high for three decades. However, after 1985 a fast decrease in fertility was observed from over 7 children per woman in the beginning of the 1980s to less than 3 in 2005–2010. Because of this decrease in fertility the population growth slowed down and also the proportion of Libyans under the age of 15 decreased from 45% in 1985 to 29% in 2010.

Births and deaths

Source: UN DESA, World Population Prospects, 2022

Other demographic statistics 
Demographic statistics according to the World Population Review in 2022.
One birth every 4 minutes	
One death every 15 minutes	
One net migrant every 288 minutes	
Net gain of one person in the population of Libya  every 6 minutes..

CIA World Factbook demographic statistics 
The following demographic statistics are from the CIA World Factbook.

Population
7,137,931 (2022 est.)
6,754,507 (July 2018 est.)
note: immigrants make up just over 12% of the total population, according to UN data (2019)

Religions
Muslim (official; virtually all Sunni) 96.6%, Christian 2.7%, Buddhist <1%, Hindu <1%, Jewish <1%, folk religion <1%, other  <1%, unafilliated <1% (2020 est.)

note: non-Sunni Muslims include native Ibadhi Muslims (<1% of the population) and foreign Muslims

Age structure

0-14 years: 33.65% (male 1,184,755/female 1,134,084)
15-24 years: 15.21% (male 534,245/female 513,728)
25-54 years: 41.57% (male 1,491,461/female 1,373,086)
55-64 years: 5.52% (male 186,913/female 193,560)
65 years and over: 4.04% (male 129,177/female 149,526) (2020 est.)

0-14 years: 25.53% (male 882,099/ female 842,320)
15-24 years: 16.81% (male 582,247/ female 553,004)
25-54 years: 47.47% (male 1,684,019/ female 1,522,027)
55-64 years: 5.77% (male 197,196/ female 192,320)
65 years and over: 4.43% (male 147,168/ female 152,107) (2018 est.)

Median age
total: 25.8 years. Country comparison to the world: 156th
male: 25.9 years
female: 25.7 years (2020 est.)

total: 29.4 years
male: 29.5 years
female: 29.2 years (2018 est.)

Population growth rate
1.65% (2022 est.) Country comparison to the world: 57th
1.45% (2018 est.)

Birth rate
21.56 births/1,000 population (2022 est.) Country comparison to the world: 62th
17.2 births/1,000 population (2018 est.)

Death rate
3.45 deaths/1,000 population (2022 est.) Country comparison to the world: 221st
3.7 deaths/1,000 population (2018 est.)

Net migration rate
-1.61 migrant(s)/1,000 population (2022 est.) Country comparison to the world: 161st
0.9 migrant(s)/1,000 population (2018 est.)

Total fertility rate
3.09 children born/woman (2022 est.) Country comparison to the world: 46th

3.71 children born/woman (2000 est.)
3.01 children born/woman (2010 est.)
2.12 children born/woman (2012 est.)
2.03 children born/woman (2018 est.)

Contraceptive prevalence rate
27.7% (2014)

Urbanization
urban population: 80.1% of total population (2018)
rate of urbanization: 1.68% annual rate of change (2015-20 est.)

Sex ratio
at birth: 1.05 male(s)/female
0–14 years: 1.05 male(s)/female
15–24 years: 1.06 male(s)/female
25–54 years: 1.1 male(s)/female
55–64 years: 1.04 male(s)/female
65 years and over: 1.01 male(s)/female
total population: 1.07 male(s)/female (2017 est.)

Infant mortality rate
total: 10.5 deaths/1,000 live births
male: 11.3 deaths/1,000 live births
female: 9.6 deaths/1,000 live births (2018 est.)

Urbanization
urban population: 81.3% of total population (2022)
rate of urbanization: 1.45% annual rate of change (2020-25 est.)

Life expectancy at birth
Total population: 73.08 years. (2020 est.)

Male: 70.27 years. (2020 est.)
Female: 76.11 years. (2020 est.)

Total population: 73.44 years. (2022 est.)
Male: 70.6 years. (2022 est.)

Female: 76.46 years. (2022 est.)
Country comparison to the world: 110rd

Literacy
Definition: The percentage of the population of a given age group that can read and write
Total population: 91%
Male: 96.7% 
Female: 85.6% (2015)

Ethnic and tribal groups

Ethnic groups
97% of Libya's population is made up of Arabs and Berbers, of which 92% are Arabs and 5% are Berbers.

The majority of the population of Libya is primarily of Arab ancestral origin. Unofficial estimates put the number of Berbers in Libya at around 600,000, about 10% of the population of Libya. Among the Berber groups are the minority Berber populations of Zuwarah and the Nafusa Mountains, and the nomadic Tuareg, who inhabit the southwestern areas as well as parts of southeastern Algeria, northern Mali, Niger and Burkina Faso. In the southeast, there are small populations of Toubou (Tibbu). They occupy about a quarter of the country and also inhabit Niger and Chad. Among foreign residents, the largest groups are from other African nations, including citizens of other North African nations (primarily Egyptians) and West Africans.

There are also a significant number of koroğlu families which are a mixed ethnic groups like Turks, circassians and some bosniaks and Albanians.

Tribal groups
Libyan society is to a large extent structured along tribal lines, with more than 20 major tribal groups.

The major tribal groups of Libya in 2011 were listed:
Tripolitan settled tribes: Misurata Ahali, Misurata Karagula, Geryan, Zawia, Misalata, Zwara Berber, Khumus
Tripolitan Bedouin tribes: Warfalla, Tarhona, Al-Zintan, Al-Rijban, Awlad Suleiman
Cyrenaican Bedouin tribes: Al-Awagir, Al-Abaydat, Drasa, Al-Barasa, Al-Fawakhir, Al-Zuwayya, Al-Majabra
Sirte Bedouin: Awlad Suleiman, Qadhadhfa, Al-Magarha, Al-Magharba, Al-Riyyah, Al-Haraba, Al-Zuwaid, Al-Guwaid
Fezzan: Awlad Suleiman, Hutman, Hassawna, Toubou, Tuareg
Kufra: Al-Zuwayya; Toubou

Some of the ancient Berber tribes include: Adyrmachidae, Auschisae, Es'bet, Temeh'u, Teh'nu, Rebu, Kehek, KeyKesh, Imukehek, Meshwesh, Macetae, Macatutae, Nasamones, Nitriotae, and Tautamaei.

 the major tribal groups of Libya, by region, were as follows: 
 Tripolitania: alawana-Souk El Joma'a, AL-Mahameed, Warfalla, Tarhona, Misurata tribes, Al-Jawary, Siyan Tribe, The Warshfana tribes, Zawia Groups, Ghryan Tribes, AL-Asabea, Al-Fwatir, Awlad Busayf, Zintan, Al-jbalya, Zwara, Alajelat, Al-Nawael tribe, Alalqa tribe, Al-Rijban, al Mashashi, Amaym.
 Cyrenaica: AJ-JWAZY, Al-Awagir, Magharba, Al-Abaydat, Drasa, Al-Barasa, Al-Fawakhir, Zuwayya, Majabra, Awama, Minfa, Taraki, alawana, Shwa'ir and in Kufra Zuwayya, Toubou.
 Sirte: Awlad Suleiman, Qadhadhfa, Magharba, Al-Hosoon, Ferrjan
 Fezzan: Awlad Suleiman, Al-Riyyah, Magarha, Al-Zuwaid, Al-Hutman, Al-Hassawna; Toubou, Tuareg.
 Kufra: Zuwayya; Toubou.

Foreign population

The foreign population is estimated at 3%, most of whom are migrant workers in the oil industry from Tunisia and Egypt, but also including small numbers of Greeks, Maltese, Italians, Pakistanis, Palestinians, Turks, Indians, and people from former Yugoslavia. Due to the Libyan Civil War, most of these migrant workers have returned to their homelands or simply left the country for a different one, however a good minority still work in Libya.
According to news accounts in Allafrica.com, and the Libya Herald, between 1 million and 2 million Egyptians are resident in Libya with Sudanese and Tunisians numbering in the hundreds to thousands. There is also up to a million undocumented migrants mainly from sub-saharan africa residing in Libya.

Genetics

Y-chromosome

Analysis of Y-chromosome have found that the Libyan population is characterized by the high frequency of haplogroup J1-M267 (39.5%) and haplogroup E-M81 (33.7%).

Listed here are the human Y-chromosome DNA haplogroups in Libya.

Religions

The vast majority Libyans are nominally Sunni Muslim. Almost 3% of the population is Christian, with some local Christian church adherents in Eastern Libya - the Copts. A small Jewish community historically lived in Libya since antiquity (see History of the Jews in Libya), but the almost the entire Jewish community in Libya eventually fled the country for Italy, Israel, or the United States, particularly after anti-Jewish riots in the wake of the 1967 Six-Day War between Arab countries and Israel. The final Jew in Libya, Esmeralda Meghnagi, died in 2002 ending the several millennia long Jewish ancestral body in Libya.

Culture

Cuisine
Libyan cuisine is mainly Arab and Mediterranean with Italian influence. Notable dishes include Shorba Arabiya, or Arabian soup, which is a thick, highly spiced soup. Like other Maghrebi countries, couscous and tajine are traditional of Libya. Bazeen is a traditional Libyan food, made from a mix of barley flour and a small amount of plain flour.

Music
Libyan music is largely Arab in nature, however some Andalusi and Berber cultures also exist. Libyan origin instruments are the Zukra (a bagpipe), a flute (made of bamboo), the tambourine, the oud (a fretless lute) and the darbuka (a goblet drum held sideways and played with the fingers). Bedouin poet-singers had a great influence on the musical folklore of Libya, particularly the style of huda, the camel driver's song.

Language

The official language of Libya is Standard Arabic, while the most prevalent spoken language is Libyan Arabic. Arabic varieties are partly spoken by immigrant workers and partly by local Libyan populations. These varieties include Egyptian, Tunisian, Sudanese, Moroccan, Yemeni, Hassaniya and South Levantine Arabic. Minority Berber languages are still spoken by the Tuareg, a rural Berber population inhabiting Libya's south, and is spoken by about 300,000 in the north, about 5% of the Libyan population.

Indigenous minority languages in Libya:
Berber languages: ca. 305,000 speakers (5% of the population)
Nafusi: 184,000 speakers (2006) (3%)
Tamahaq: 47,000 speakers (2006) (<1%)
Ghadamès: 30,000 speakers (2006) (<1%)
Sawknah: 5,600 speakers (2006) (<1%)
Awjilah: 3,000 speakers (2000) (<1%)
Domari: ca. 33,000 speakers (2006) (<1%)
Tedaga: 2,000 speakers (<1%)

Non-Arabic languages had largely been spoken by foreign workers (who had been massively employed in Libya in various infrastructure projects prior to the 2011 civil war), and those languages with more than 10,000 speakers included Punjabi, Urdu, Mandarin, Cantonese, Korean, Sinhala, Bengal, Tamil, Tagalog, French, Italian, Ukrainian, Serbian, and English.

See also

 Health in Libya
 List of Ashraf tribes in Libya

References

External links
Looklex Encyclopedia

Attribution